Toivo Armas Aalto-Setälä (2 February 1896 – 3 April 1977) was a Finnish lawyer and politician. He was born in Köyliö and was a member of the Parliament of Finland from 1927 to 1929 and from 1930 to 1933, representing the National Coalition Party.

References

1896 births
1977 deaths
People from Köyliö
People from Turku and Pori Province (Grand Duchy of Finland)
National Coalition Party politicians
Members of the Parliament of Finland (1927–29)
Members of the Parliament of Finland (1930–33)
Finnish military personnel of World War II
University of Helsinki alumni